Ramazan Abbasov (born 22 September 1983 in Salakh, Armenia) is an Azerbaijani footballer who plays as a midfielder, most recently for Səbail, and previously for Azerbaijan.

Career
In January 2015, Abbasov went on trial with Azerbaijan Premier League side FK Baku.

Career statistics

Club

International

Statistics accurate as of match played 17 October 2007

Honors
FC Baku
Azerbaijan Premier League (1): 2005–06

References

External links 
 

1983 births
Living people
Armenian Azerbaijanis
Azerbaijani footballers
Azerbaijan international footballers
Association football midfielders
FC Baku players
MOIK Baku players
Khazar Lankaran FK players
Sumgayit FK players
Ravan Baku FC players
Azerbaijan Premier League players
Neftçi PFK players
People from Tavush Province